Lionel Giles (29 December 1875 – 22 January 1958) was a British sinologist, writer, and philosopher. Lionel Giles served as assistant curator at the British Museum and Keeper of the Department of Oriental Manuscripts and Printed Books. He is most notable for his 1910 translations of The Art of War by Sun Tzu and The Analects of Confucius.

Giles was the son of British diplomat and sinologist Herbert Giles.

Early life
Giles was born in Sutton, the fourth son of Herbert Giles and his first wife Catherine Fenn. Educated privately in Belgium (Liège), Austria (Feldkirch), and Scotland (Aberdeen), Giles studied Classics at Wadham College, Oxford, graduating BA in 1899.

The Art of War

The 1910 Giles translation of The Art of War succeeded British officer Everard Ferguson Calthrop's 1905 and 1908 translations, and refuted large portions of Calthrop's work. In the Introduction, Giles writes: It is not merely a question of downright blunders, from which none can hope to be wholly exempt. Omissions were frequent; hard passages were willfully distorted or slurred over. Such offenses are less pardonable. They would not be tolerated in any edition of a Latin or Greek classic, and a similar standard of honesty ought to be insisted upon in translations from Chinese.

Sinology
Lionel Giles used the Wade-Giles romanisation method of translation, pioneered by his father Herbert. Like many sinologists in the Victorian and Edwardian eras, he was primarily interested in Chinese literature, which was approached as a branch of classics. Victorian sinologists contributed greatly to problems of textual transmission of the classics. The following quote shows Giles' attitude to the problem identifying the authors of ancient works like the Lieh Tzu, the Chuang Tzu and the Tao Te Ching:
The extent of the actual mischief done by this "Burning of the Books" has been greatly exaggerated. Still, the mere attempt at such a holocaust gave a fine chance to the scholars of the later Han dynasty (A.D. 25-221), who seem to have enjoyed nothing so much as forging, if not the whole, at any rate portions, of the works of ancient authors. Some one even produced a treatise under the name of Lieh Tzu, a philosopher mentioned by Chuang Tzu, not seeing that the individual in question was a creation of Chuang Tzu's brain!

Continuing to produce translations of Chinese classics well into the later part of his life, he was quoted by John Minford as having confessed to a friend that he was a "Taoist at heart, and I can well believe it, since he was fond of a quiet life, and was free of that extreme form of combative scholarship which seems to be the hall mark of most Sinologists."

Translations
The prodigious translations of Lionel Giles include the books of: Sun Tzu, Chuang Tzu, Lao Tzu, Mencius, and Confucius.

The Art of War (1910), originally published as The Art of War: The Oldest Military Treatise in the World
The Analects of Confucius (1910), also known as the Analects or The Sayings of Confucius
The Sayings of Lao Tzu and Taoist Teachings (1912), now known as the Tao Te Ching
The Book of Mencius (1942), originally published as Wisdom of the East
The Life of Ch'iu Chin and The Lament on the Lady of the Ch'inA Gallery of Chinese Immortals (1948), excerpts from the Liexian Zhuan, reprinted 1979 by AMS Press (New York).

See also
Chinese language
Chinese literature
Chinese classics
Sinology
Wade-Giles Romanization system

References

 External links 

 
 
 
Lionel Giles' Translation of the Tao Te Ching at sacred-texts
Lionel Giles' Translation from Taoist teachings from the book of Lieh Tzŭ'' at Wikisource
A Gallery of Chinese Immortals translated by Lionel Giles

1875 births
1958 deaths
British philosophers
British sinologists
British translators
Chinese–English translators
Employees of the British Library
People from the London Borough of Sutton
Writers from London